Family Christian Academy (FCA) is a private Christian school in Channelview, unincorporated Harris County, Texas, in the Houston metropolitan area. It serves Pre-Kindergarten through Grade 12.

References

External links
 Family Christian Academy

Private K-12 schools in Harris County, Texas
Christian schools in Texas